Yury Sisikin (born 15 May 1937) is a Soviet fencer. He won two gold and two silver medals at three different Olympic Games.

References

1937 births
Living people
Russian male fencers
Soviet male fencers
Olympic fencers of the Soviet Union
Fencers at the 1960 Summer Olympics
Fencers at the 1964 Summer Olympics
Fencers at the 1968 Summer Olympics
Olympic gold medalists for the Soviet Union
Olympic silver medalists for the Soviet Union
Olympic medalists in fencing
Sportspeople from Saratov
Medalists at the 1960 Summer Olympics
Medalists at the 1964 Summer Olympics
Medalists at the 1968 Summer Olympics
Universiade medalists in fencing
Universiade silver medalists for the Soviet Union
Medalists at the 1959 Summer Universiade
Medalists at the 1961 Summer Universiade